Abdul Aziz Lutfi Akbar (born 14 February 1994) is an Indonesian professional footballer who plays as a central midfielder for Liga 1 club Persib Bandung.

Club career

Early career
In January 2015, Abdul Aziz joined the Futsal Super League team Libido FC Bandung. Abdul also played for in FKB (Futsal Kota Bandung) in 2013.

Persiba Balikpapan
He made his debut against Arema Cronus in the first week of the 2016 season and made his first goal against Persegres Gresik United in the ninth week.

Borneo
In 2017, Abdul Aziz signed a contract with Indonesian Liga 1 club Borneo. He made his league debut on 22 July 2017 in a match against Perseru Serui at the Segiri Stadium, Samarinda.

PSMS Medan
He was signed for PSMS Medan to play in Liga 1 in the 2018 season. Abdul Aziz made his debut on 24 March 2018 in a match against Bali United at the Kapten I Wayan Dipta Stadium, Gianyar.

Persib Bandung
In 2019, Abdul Aziz signed a one-year contract with Indonesian Liga 1 club Persib Bandung. He made his debut on 23 June 2019 in a match against Madura United at the Si Jalak Harupat Stadium, Soreang.

Career statistics

Club

References

External links
 
 Abdul Aziz Lutfi Akbar at Liga Indonesia

1994 births
Living people
Indonesian footballers
Sportspeople from Bandung
Sportspeople from West Java
Persiba Balikpapan players
Borneo F.C. players
PSMS Medan players
Persib Bandung players
Liga 1 (Indonesia) players
Association football midfielders